The Aqueduct of Nottolini is an aqueduct in Neoclassical Style near the city of Lucca, region of Tuscany, Italy. The 19th-century structure brought water to Lucca from the mountains south of the city through a stone channel supported by more than 400 arches, stretching for over 3 kilometres. It is now interrupted by the east-west autostrada A11 from Florence to Pisa.

Construction

While the arches of the aqueduct are often confused as being those of an ancient Roman aqueduct, construction of the aqueduct was begun in 1823 by the architect Lorenzo Nottolini, under the rule of Maria Luisa of Spain, Duchess of Lucca, and continued until 1851. In the slopes of Monte di Vorno, a number of springs were conveyed through rocky channels to a domed circular stone temple-cistern located near San Quirico in the frazione of Guamo.

The water was then conveyed northward through covered stone conduits to the temple-tank of San Concordio, just outside the fortified walls of Lucca. The arches were mainly built with brick.

From the San Concordio tank, potable water was led by metal pipes into fountains in the city, starting with the circular fountain in Piazza Antelminelli next to Lucca Cathedral.

When inaugurated, the flow of water was governed completely by gravity. The final iron conduits allowed for expansion and contraction of the metal. The interruption of the aqueduct occurred when the autostrada was constructed by Benito Mussolini's government in 1928–1932.

References

Nottolini Aqueduct
Neoclassical architecture in Tuscany
Buildings and structures in Lucca